State Road 57 (SR 57) in the U.S. state of Indiana is a north–south, largely two-lane road in the southwestern portion of the state.

Route description

SR 57 begins at U.S. Highway 41 in Evansville and provides access to Evansville Regional Airport. It is routed concurrently with Interstate 69 to SR 68 just north of Interstate 64 then is concurrent with SR 68 for roughly 1 mile before resuming its original route. The highway serves a number of small communities and the cities of Oakland City, Petersburg and Washington. The final few miles of SR 57 are concurrent with US 231.

In 2009, a portion of SR 57 was relocated onto the new I-69 route and overlapped with SR 68. The original route has been removed and now exists only as a service road to the Warrick County Industrial Park. 

Prior to Interstate 69, SR 57 had been a frequently congested highway with a number of dangerous intersections, such as SR 68 near Haubstadt, SR 168 in Mackey, SR 64 in Oakland City, SR 56 and SR 61 in Petersburg, US 50 in Washington and SR 58 in Elnora. The road had been widened in a number of spots to accommodate the heavy volume.

Major intersections

References

External links

057
Transportation in Daviess County, Indiana
Transportation in Gibson County, Indiana
Transportation in Greene County, Indiana
Transportation in Pike County, Indiana
Transportation in Vanderburgh County, Indiana